Chertanovo Severnoye District  is a territorial division (a district, or raion) in Southern Administrative Okrug, one of the 125 in the federal city of Moscow, Russia. It is located in the south of the federal city. As of the 2010 Census, the total population of the district was 111,875.

Municipal status
As a municipal division, the district is incorporated as Chertanovo Severnoye Municipal Okrug.

References

Notes

Sources

Districts of Moscow
